Megachile subferox is a species of bee in the family Megachilidae. It was described by Meade-Waldo in 1915.

References

Subferox
Insects described in 1915